General Allen may refer to:

Arthur Allen (general) (1894–1959), Australian Army major general
Augustus F. Allen (1813–1875), New York Militia brigadier general
Chester R. Allen (1905–1972), U.S. Marine Corps major general
Ethan Allen (1737–1789), Vermont Republic Militia major general
Frances J. Allen (fl. 1980s–2020s), Canadian Armed Forces lieutenant general
George C. Allen II (fl. 1970s–1990s), Delaware Air National Guard brigadier general
Harrison Allen (general) (1835–1904), Union Army brevet brigadier general
Henry Tureman Allen (1859–1930), U.S. Army major general
Henry Watkins Allen (1820–1866), Confederate States Army brigadier general
Hubert Allison Allen (1872–1942), U.S. Army brigadier general
James R. Allen (1925–1992), U.S. Air Force four-star general
John J. Allen (general) (fl. 1990s–2020s), U.S. Air Force major general
John R. Allen (born 1953), U.S. Marine Corps four-star general
John R. Allen Jr. (born 1935), U.S. Air Force brigadier general
Lew Allen (1925–2010), U.S. Air Force four-star general
Robert Allen (footballer) (1886–1981), British Army major general
Robert Allen (general) (1811–1886), Union Army brigadier general
Roderick R. Allen (1894–1970), U.S. Army major general
William W. Allen (general) (1835–1894), Confederate States Army brigadier general

See also
Engin Alan (born 1945), Turkish Army general
William Allan (British Army officer) (1832–1918), British Army major general
Daniel B. Allyn (born 1959), U.S. Army four-star general
Attorney General Allen (disambiguation)